John J. McNichols (January 8, 1927 – December 9, 2020) was an American lawyer and politician.

McNichols was born in Chicago, Illinois. He grew up in Berwyn, Illinois and went to St. Odilo's Elementary School. He went to St. Ignatius College Prep in Chicago. McNichols served in the United States Navy during World War II. He received his bachelor's degree from Loyola University Chicago in 1949 and his law degree from Loyola University Chicago School of Law in 1953. He practiced law in Chicago. McNichols served in the Illinois House of Representatives in 1965 and 1966 and was a Democrat. McNichols died in Arlington Heights, Illinois.

Notes

1927 births
2020 deaths
Lawyers from Chicago
Politicians from Chicago
People from Berwyn, Illinois
Military personnel from Illinois
Loyola University Chicago School of Law alumni
Democratic Party members of the Illinois House of Representatives